= Medal "For services in the education of military patriotism" =

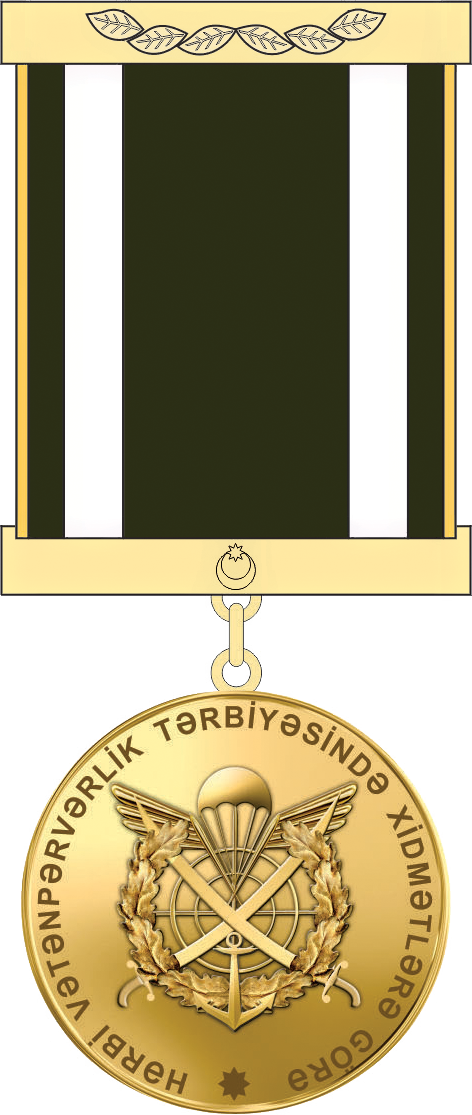
- Medal "For services in the education of military patriotism"
- Type: medal
- Country: Azerbaijan
- Presented by: the state
- Eligibility: active military service before February 13, 2018

Medal "For services in the education of military patriotism" (Azerbaijani: "Hərbi vətənpərvərlik tərbiyəsində xidmətlərə görə" medalı) is a state award of Azerbaijan. The award was established on February 13, 2018, in accordance with the law numbered 1001-VQD.

== Description of the medal ==
The medal of the Republic of Azerbaijan "For services in military patriotic education" is awarded to servicemen, civil servants and other persons of the relevant executive authority for services in the organization of mobilization and conscription, military patriotic education and patriotic propaganda.

== The way of wearing ==
The medal of the Azerbaijan Republic "For services in education of military patriotism" is put on the left side of a breast, after other orders and medals of the Azerbaijan Republic.
